Laurel Hill may refer to:

Places
Laurel Hill, New South Wales, Australia, a town in the Riverina region
Laurel Hill Coláiste, a school in Limerick, Ireland

United States
Laurel Hill, Florida, a city in Okaloosa County
Laurel Hill, Scotland County, North Carolina, an unincorporated community
Laurel Hill, Lincoln County, North Carolina, an unincorporated community
Laurel Hill (Oregon), a historic hill on the Oregon Trail
Laurel Hill (Pennsylvania), also known as Laurel Ridge, located in the Allegheny Mountains
Laurel Hill, Virginia, a census-designated place in Fairfax County
Laurel Hill Cemetery (disambiguation)
Laurel Hill Creek, a tributary of the Youghiogheny River in Pennsylvania
Laurel Hill Mansion, an historic mansion in east Fairmount Park, Philadelphia, Pennsylvania
Laurel Hill Plantation (disambiguation)

Other uses
Snake Hill, also known as Laurel Hill, an igneous rock intrusion in New Jersey
Laurel Mountain (West Virginia), also known as Laurel Hill, site of the Battle of Laurel Hill

See also